Luzmary Guedez (born 9 August 1981 in Yaracuy, Venezuela) is a Venezuelan athlete who competes in compound archery. She was the winner of the 2009 FITA Archery World Cup final, and won several World Cup stages from 2007–09, as well as winning medals in a range of national, regional and international individual and team competitions.

In 2009, she became the number one ranked women's compound archer in the world.

References

1981 births
Living people
Venezuelan female archers
World Archery Championships medalists
Central American and Caribbean Games gold medalists for Venezuela
Central American and Caribbean Games bronze medalists for Venezuela
Competitors at the 2006 Central American and Caribbean Games
Competitors at the 2010 Central American and Caribbean Games
South American Games gold medalists for Venezuela
South American Games silver medalists for Venezuela
South American Games medalists in archery
Competitors at the 2010 South American Games
Central American and Caribbean Games medalists in archery
People from Yaracuy
20th-century Venezuelan women
21st-century Venezuelan women